Uroyoán Ramón Emeterio Walker Ramos (born in Brooklyn, New York) is a mathematician, college professor, and former President of the University of Puerto Rico (UPR). He completed a bachelor's degree in mathematics at the University of Puerto Rico, Mayaguez Campus (UPRM), and a master's and Ph.D. both from Louisiana State University. Before his appointment as president he served at several roles including as associate dean of administrative affair at UPRM, associate director for graduate studies at UPRM, academic senator, and member of the board of trustees of the whole UPR system. He was removed from office by the Board of Trustees amid cronyism scandals regarding institutional scholarships.

Notes

References

University of Puerto Rico alumni
Year of birth missing (living people)
Living people
Louisiana State University alumni
Presidents of the University of Puerto Rico